Trace Vault (formerly Video Vault and The Vault) is a British free-to-air music channel owned by Trace Group.

On 1 November 2019, the channel rebranded as Trace Vault following TRACE's takeover of Sony's music channels. The first song on the new TRACE Vault was "Crank That (Soulja Boy)" by Soulja Boy Tell'em.

History
The network originally launched as a late night (3am to 6am) service called Video Vault on 12 March 2003. It was renamed The Vault on 16 July 2003 and increased hours to 8pm to 6am, then expanded to 24 hours a day on 17 September 2003. The channel played nostalgic music and classic pop from the 1960s onwards, occasionally featuring music videos and concert footage from as early as at least the 1950s.

The Vault logo was on screen in the top left-hand corner during music videos and the song information faded in and out, at the bottom of the screen, at the start and near the end of each music video.

The Vault rebranded with a new logo and graphics presentation on 29 April 2010 along with newly themed content and a much more diverse mix of classic pop, classic dance, classic rock, classic RnB, love songs and chill out music throughout the previous 25 years. By 2011, the channel focused on old and new pop music. A further rebrand took place in 2014. Another rebrand happened in 2016 with some entertainment shows from the 90s being added gradually.

The channel was launched on Freeview in November 2017, replacing Chart Show TV, but was removed on 7 November 2018 and its slot being replaced by its former sister channel True Movies +1. The channel was also available on Freesat channel 501 since the platform's launch until its removal on 21 October 2019, when it was replaced by Christmas Starz.

The last song to be played before the rebrand was "Cry Me a River" by Justin Timberlake but, as happened on the network's sister channels, the song was cut part way through.

Programming

Current entertainment shows 

Clarissa Explains it All
 Kenan & Kel
 Moesha* 
The Parkers*
 Sister, Sister
 Clueless
 The Simple Life 
 Mighty Morphin Power Rangers

Former music programming 

80s Ballads - The best power ballads from the 1980s.
Back to... - All the biggest songs from a certain year.
Battle of the... - Music from artists or bands based on different themes.
Best of the 1980s - Hit music videos from the 1980s.
Best of the 1990s - The best music from the 1990s.
Cuddie up with Vault - Relaxing chill-out music.
Feel Good Anthems
Greatest Number 2s - The best songs to reach number two from different years.
Hits from Flix - The best music from top films.
Hunkz and Honeyz - Classic videos featuring the best artists.
Infinite Classics - All-time classic songs.
Karaoke Klassics - A collection of classic karaoke songs.
Motown Classics - Classic motown music videos.
Number 1s at One - The best chart topping songs from previous years.
Number 1s of... - Number one songs from a chosen year.
Number 2s at Two - Classic songs from previous years that made it to number two in the charts.
Original vs Cover - A collection of original songs and their cover versions.
Rise and Shine - Classic music videos.
Same but Different - Different songs with shared titles.
Saturday Nite Party - Classic party anthems.
Thank Classic it's Friday! - The best feel good music.
The Greatest No. 1s of the 80s - The best number one songs from the 1980s.
The Greatest No. 1s of the Noughties - Big hit number one songs.
The Very Best of... - The biggest songs from a chosen year.
Thru the Years - A look back at the life and music of a particular artist or band.
Top 5 at 5... - The best five songs from an artist.
Top 10 Hits - A countdown of the top 10 songs from different years.
Top 20 80s Ballads - A countdown of the 1980s top 20 power ballads.
Vault Classics - Non-stop classic music videos.
Vault Hits - The best music from the last five years.
Vault Loves... Non-stop music from a certain artist or band.
Vault's Pub Jukebox - The best classic songs.
Vault's Top 10 - The top 10 classic videos from a particular year.
Vault @ Nite - Non-stop classic music videos.
Vault's Best Selection - A collection of the best classic songs.
Videos from The Vault - Hit songs from previous years.
Weekend Wake up - Classic music videos.
What was Big in...? - The biggest news in showbiz from a certain year.
Where are They Now?... - Best songs from that particular artist.

Former entertainment shows
Sabrina the Teenage Witch On The Vault from (2014-2019)
Sweet Valley High  On The Vault from (2017-2019)
Malibu , CA On The Vault from (2017-2018)
Saved by the Bell On The Vault from 2015 to 2017)
Saved by the Bell: Hawaiian Style On The Vault from (2015-2017)
Saved by the Bell : Wedding in Las Vegas On The Vault from (2015-2017)
Saved by the Bell: The College Years On The Vault from (2015-2017)
Saved by the Bell : The New Class On The Vault from (2015-2017)

References

External links
The Vault on MySpace.

Music video networks in the United Kingdom
CSC Media Group
Television channels and stations established in 2003
2003 establishments in the United Kingdom